Donald A. Bryant is an American bioscientist, currently the Ernest Pollard Chair of Biotechnology at the Eberly College of Science, Pennsylvania State University and a published author. He is widely cited by his peers and widely held in libraries.

References

Year of birth missing (living people)
Living people
Pennsylvania State University faculty
21st-century American biologists
Fellows of the American Academy of Microbiology